Ryan Papenhuyzen (born 10 June 1998) is an Australian professional rugby league footballer who plays as a  for the Melbourne Storm of the National Rugby League (NRL) in Australia. He is a NRL premiership winning player of 2020.

Early life
Papenhuyzen was born in Sydney, Australia, and is of Dutch descent.

He grew up in Kellyville, New South Wales, was educated at Oakhill College, Castle Hill and represented the 2015 Australian Schoolboys. After graduating high school, he attended Australian Catholic University studying degree in Physical Activity, Health and Exercise Science.

He played touch football and played his junior rugby league for Kellyville Bushrangers, Dundas Shamrocks and the Hills District Bulls before being signed by Balmain Tigers.

Career

Early career
Papenhuyzen played his junior representative rugby league for Balmain in the S. G. Ball Cup and Harold Matthews Cup. He later played for the Wests Tigers NRL Under-20s team.  He then signed with Melbourne after he was released by the Wests Tigers due to the club wishing to re-sign James Tedesco.

At Melbourne Papenhuyzen played for their under 20s and feeder team Sunshine Coast Falcons for 2018. With consistent performances he gained selection for New South Wales under 20s State of Origin.

2019
He made his Melbourne debut while he was only 20 years old in round 4 of the 2019 NRL season against the Canterbury-Bankstown Bulldogs. He had his Melbourne jersey (cap number 194) presented to him by former Melbourne player Billy Slater. 
Papenhuyzen had a breakout performance in round 9 against the Parramatta Eels at Suncorp Stadium, coming onto the field in the 49th minute, he scored a try, ran for 137 metres and had 3 line breaks, 2 line break assists and 2 try assists as Melbourne won 64–10.

On 7 October, Papenhuyzen earned his first representative jersey as he was named in the Australian side for the 2019 Rugby League World Cup 9s. Later that day, he was named at fullback in the U23 Junior Kangaroos squad. Papenhuyzen scored 2 tries in the Junior Kangaroos’ 62–4 victory over France.

2020
In a Round 8 match against the Sydney Roosters, Melbourne were down 25-24 with 40 seconds remaining. Melbourne regathered from the kick-off and with time running out, Papenhuyzen kicked an equalising field goal, his first in the NRL.

In the 2020 NRL Grand Final, which Melbourne won 26-20, Papenhuyzen won the Clive Churchill Medal for his Man of the Match performance.

Papenhuyzen was selected in the NSW Origin squad for the 2020 State of Origin series, but was withdrawn from selection for game one through injury. He was not selected in the team for either game two or three.

2021
Papenhuyzen began the 2021 season at fullback and as designated goal kicker after the retirement of Cameron Smith. In Round 4, Melbourne defeated the Brisbane Broncos 40-6 with Papenhuyzen scoring four tries in 11 minutes. This equaled, what was at the time, the club record for the most scored in a single game. Papenhuyzen also kicked five goals in this game and with a combined points total of 26, he climbed into second place for the most points scored in a single game by a Melbourne Storm player. By the end of this round he was in first place on the league's list for most points scored. In Round 10 against St. George Illawarra, Papenhuyzen suffered a severe concussion after a high tackle from Tyrell Fuimaono in the 11th minute of the game, ruling him out of a place in NSW's State of Origin squad for 2021 and ruling him out for the majority of the season. Papenhuyzen returned to Melbourne's starting side in Round 19 against North Queensland, playing only 33 minutes from the interchange bench.

Papenhuyzen played a total of 15 games for Melbourne in the 2021 NRL season and scored 14 tries as the club won 19 matches in a row and claimed the Minor Premiership. Papenhuyzen scored 157 points for the season. He played in all three finals matches including the preliminary final where Melbourne suffered a shock 10-6 loss against eventual premiers Penrith.

2022
In Round 4 of the 2022 NRL season, Papenhuyzen set a new career-high points in a game with 28 points against Canterbury-Bankstown Bulldogs, scoring four tries and six goals.
In round 9 of the 2022 NRL season, Papenhuyzen was taken from the field during Melbourne's victory over St. George Illawarra. It was later announced that Papenhuyzen would miss four to six matches with a hamstring and knee injury.In round 16, Papenhuyzen made his return to the Melbourne side and scored two tries in a 36-30 loss against Manly.

In round 18, Papenhuyzen was taken from the field in Melbourne's 20-16 loss against Canberra with a suspected fractured kneecap.
On 19 July, it was confirmed that Papenhuyzen would miss the remainder of the 2022 NRL season.

2023
On 14 February, it was announced that Papenhuyzen would miss the first eight rounds of the 2023 NRL season due to an ongoing injury.

Honours
Melbourne Storm
NRL premiership: 2020
NRL minor premiership: 2019, 2021

Individual
 Clive Churchill Medal: 2020
 Melbourne Storm Rookie of the Year: 2019
 Melbourne Storm Back of the Year: 2020, 2021, 2022

References

External links
Storm profile
18th Man profile

1998 births
Living people
Australian people of Dutch descent
Australian rugby league players
Melbourne Storm players
Rugby league fullbacks
Rugby league players from Sydney
People educated at Oakhill College
Sunshine Coast Falcons players
Clive Churchill Medal winners